Andy Griffiths may refer to:

 Andy Griffiths (author) (born 1961), Australian children's book author and comedy writer
 Andy Griffiths (executive), Australian-born electronics director

See also
 Andrew Griffiths (disambiguation)
 Andy Griffith (1926–2012), American actor